Gorion may refer to:
 Yosef ben Gorion, chronicle of Jewish history
 Micha Yosef Bin-Gorion (1865-1921), Russian-born Hebrew scholar

See also 
 Midrash Abba Gorion, a late midrash to the Book of Esther
 Gorion, a fictional character in the Baldur's Gate video game franchise
Gurion

Hebrew-language surnames